The Ponte da Ribeira de Cobres (Bridge of Ribeira dos Cobres) is a bridge in the civil parish, in the municipality of Almodôvar in the Portuguese district of Beja.

History
The bridge has been dated to between the 12th and 13th century, using shale rock.

By 1758 it was the only bridge crossing the Ribeira dos Cobres.

The bridge was greatly damaged following seasonal storms in 1970, and repaired in the proceeding months.

Architecture
Situated in a transition zone between agricultural lands and urbanized areas, with modern buildings within its proximity (specifically the quartel of the volunteer firefighters). It is located in a valley crossing the Ribeira de Cobres, oriented from east to west, alongside a rural road,  from the new bridge (linking the margins along the E.N.267).

Two of these arches are separated from the remaining arch by a reinforced contraforte, with the eastern side of the bridge larger than the western.

References

Notes

Sources

See also
List of bridges in Portugal

Bridges in Beja District